"The Suffering" is a song by American progressive rock band Coheed and Cambria, appearing on the band's third studio album Good Apollo, I'm Burning Star IV, Volume One: From Fear Through the Eyes of Madness. The song was released as the album's second single and had some crossover success, reaching no. 10 on the Billboard Bubbling Under Hot 100 chart.

Reception
"The Suffering" has received positive reviews. The song was selected as an AllMusic reviewer's pick in Rob Theakston's review of the album. Jordan Blum of PopMatters called the song a "sublime blend of catchiness and complexity" that makes the song "instantly appealing and unforgettable."

Track listing
Promo single

Enhanced CD single

7" single

Personnel
Coheed and Cambria
Claudio Sanchez – lead vocals, guitar, piano
Travis Stever – guitar
Michael Todd – bass
Josh Eppard – drums

Additional
Sarah Kathryn Jacobs – backing vocals
Danny Louis – keyboards

Charts

References

External links
Official Music Video on YouTube

2005 songs
2006 singles
Coheed and Cambria songs
Columbia Records singles
Songs written by Claudio Sanchez